Jack Manson Tuck (13 May 1907 – 23 March 1967) was a New Zealand rugby union player. A utility back, Tuck represented  and briefly  at a provincial level, and was a member of the New Zealand national side, the All Blacks, on their 1929 tour of Australia. On that tour, he played six matches for the All Blacks including all three internationals.

References

1907 births
1967 deaths
Rugby union players from the Hawke's Bay Region
People educated at Hamilton Boys' High School
New Zealand rugby union players
New Zealand international rugby union players
Waikato rugby union players
Wellington rugby union players
Rugby union fullbacks
Rugby union scrum-halves
Rugby union fly-halves